Holly Morris is a television reporter for WTTG in Washington D.C. since 1998. She is originally from Cincinnati, Ohio. She graduated from Duke University in 1993 with a degree in civil engineering.

Morris is one of a team of four anchors for the morning newscast from 4:30 am to 9 am, and the Good Day DC show from 9 am to 11 am. She was known at the station for her remote reporting during the early morning news covering community events where she often participated in the activities she reported on.

She has won four regional Emmy awards., for "Best Live Reporting" as well as a regional Edward R. Murrow award.

In 2014, Morris helped to raise awareness of the disease ALS by participating in the Ice Bucket Challenge during a segment on Fox 5. She was ridiculed on the nationally syndicated radio show, the Don and Mike Show which in 2007 featured a weekly "Wheel of Holly" segment where tapes of her past features were played at random.

Personal
Morris married lawyer Thomas Espy on July 21, 2007. Their son is named Hayden Espy They live in Rockville, Maryland and have a son.

References

External links
 Holly Morris's blog

Living people
Duke University Pratt School of Engineering alumni
1971 births
Television anchors from Washington, D.C.